The Darktown Follies, originally staged as My Friend from Kentucky in 1913, is an American musical revue comedy that debuted in 1914. It has 3 acts. It premiered in 1913 at the Lafayette Theatre in Harlem, New York City. It brought the Ballin' the Jack dance and the Texas Tommy (a predecessor of the lindy hop) to a New York City stage and its success influenced musicals that followed.

See also
Minstrel show
Coon song
A Trip to Coontown
Broadway Rastus
Shuffle Along

References

1913 musicals
Musical comedy plays